Rebecca Liddiard (born ) is a Canadian actress. She is known for her role as Constable Adelaide Stratton in the 2016 trans-Atlantic mystery series Houdini & Doyle and as morality officer Mary Shaw in Frankie Drake Mysteries.

Life and career
Liddiard was born in London, Ontario. She studied theatre performance at Ryerson University. Liddiard moved to Toronto when she was 18, and continued to live there . Before being cast in Houdini & Doyle, Liddiard was working as a part-time office manager.

Liddiard appears as the lead character Ella in the web series MsLabelled. She had the recurring role of Hanna on the City science-fiction drama series Between. She portrayed the lead character Thai in the Tarragon Theatre production of Kat Sandler's play Mustard. Liddiard has achieved wider recognition after being cast in the role constable Adelaide Stratton in the British-Canadian-American period mystery series Houdini & Doyle in 2016. 

From 2017 to 2021, Liddiard played the regular role of Mary, a morality police officer in 1920s Toronto, in the CBC mystery-drama series, Frankie Drake Mysteries. In 2019, she played airplane crash survivor Madelyn in the first season of the British-Canadian thriller television series Departure.

Filmography

References

External links
 

Actresses from London, Ontario
Living people
Toronto Metropolitan University alumni
1990s births
Canadian television actresses
21st-century Canadian actresses
Canadian web series actresses